The England women's cricket team toured South Africa in 2003–04, playing five women's One Day Internationals.

One Day International series

1st ODI

2nd ODI

3rd ODI

4th ODI

5th ODI

Tour matches

50-over tour match: England Women v Northerns Women

50-over tour match: England Women v Boland and Western Province Women's Invitation XI

50-over tour match: England Women v Boland and Eastern Province Women's Invitation XI

50-over tour match: England Women v Northerns Women

References

Women's international cricket tours of South Africa
2004 in South African cricket
2004 in women's cricket
2004 in South African women's sport
2004 in English women's sport
South Africa 2003
Women 2003
International cricket competitions in 2003–04
February 2004 sports events in Africa
March 2004 sports events in Africa